Peter Charles Combe OAM (born 20 October 1948) is an Australian children's entertainer and musician. At the ARIA Music Awards he has won three ARIA Awards for Best Children's Album, for Toffee Apple (1988), Newspaper Mama (1989) and The Absolutely Very Best of Peter Combe (So Far) Recorded in Concert (1992) and three additional nominations (Chopsticks (1990), Little Groover (1996) and Live It Up (2017)). His best-known tracks are "Toffee Apple", "Spaghetti Bolognaise", "Mr Clicketty Cane", "Juicy Juicy Green Grass" and "Newspaper Mama". His Christmas Album (November 1990) reached the ARIA Albums Chart top 50.

Biography

1948-1979: Early life
Peter Charles Combe was born in Adelaide on 20 October 1948 as the third of four children. His early influences from the 1950s were the Springfields; he learned to harmonise from an early age. He was inspired by folk singers of the 1960s, including Peter, Paul and Mary, Simon & Garfunkel, Joni Mitchell and Bob Dylan. He formed a folk group and taught himself guitar. Later he became fascinated by the Beatles and Billy Joel.

By 1969, Combe was a primary school teacher and in the early 1970s, he was a specialist music teacher. He taught junior school music at Prince Alfred College in the late 1970s. He started writing songs for his students and in 1973 he wrote his first "operettas" for them. One of the early ones, Bows Against the Barons, is based on Geoffrey Trease's novel of the same name, relating the legend of Robin Hood. The song, "Robin Hood's Dream", appeared on his 1988 album, Newspaper Mama.

In 1975, Combe moved to Sydney and aspired to be the next Paul Simon. There he appeared in the rock musical, Sergeant Pepper's Lonely Hearts Club. He taught at inner Sydney primary schools, performed in pubs and clubs as a singer-songwriter. He wrote a children's musical, Frederick WhatsHisName & his TwoLegged Six String Guitar, which provided the track, "Spangle Road". Another of his musicals is based on Norman Lindsay's book, The Magic Pudding.

In 1977, Combe migrated to England where he became a presenter on Music Time, a BBC Television educational program. He explained that "Someone in Adelaide had given me the name of a BBC producer. I rang and said I had just arrived [in England] and do you have any shows I can audition for. They wanted someone for Music Time, I auditioned, made the short list and got the job." Combe and co-presenter, Kathryn Harries, introduced musical concepts in an entertaining format. The show was used by teachers as part of their music programs and was a resource for other music educators. Besides being played in Britain for six years, it was re-broadcast on ABC TV. In late 1979, the Combe family moved back to Australia, where he presented Let's Have Music, an Australian Broadcasting Corporation (ABC) radio program, which was used for primary school music education.

1980-1992: Commercial success
In 1980 he recorded his first album, Vagabond, which was aimed at adults. The title track had been recorded by ex-pat Australians, the Seekers, in 1977. After two more years teaching, Combe issued his second album, Songs for Little Kids. It was recorded and produced by Combe at Axent Recording Studio in Sydney and appeared on ABC Records on cassette.

At that time, children's albums comprised nursery rhymes, which were sung and played in a simple traditional style. Combe recalled, "record companies used to think anyone could write songs for children, anything was good enough. You would get whole albums where the only accompaniment was acoustic guitar." Combe introduced new concepts in children's songs, writing to appeal to children and their parents: they were funny and relevant. He arranged them with contemporary instrumentation, using his Music Time experience to introduce children to different musical concepts, genres and instruments. Combe started performing concerts in schools – about 200 school shows a year over three years. His next cassette, Spaghetti Bolognaise and More Songs for Little Kids (1985), was soon renamed as Spaghetti Bolognaise after its lead track.

In 1986, he returned to England for an eight-month stay – he wrote material for his next album, Toffee Apple (June 1987). Back in Australia he met Diana Manson, then the head of ABC Music, and they worked on the first ever children's music video filmed in Australia – "Toffee Apple" – to promote the new album. The music video was played during children's programming on ABC TV, and helped established Combe as Australia's first kids' pop star: he was referred to as King of the Kids. At the ARIA Music Awards of 1988 Combe won the inaugural ARIA Award for Best Children's Album category for Toffee Apple.

In 1989, he won his second ARIA for Best Children's Album, for Newspaper Mama (1988). The Canberra Times correspondent described him as "the master of loony tunes for kids"; with this album having "a selection of original songs with the title track accompanied by an imaginative video." His next album, Chopsticks (September 1989), was also nominated in that category in the following year but it did not win. Peter Combe's Christmas Album (November 1990) reached the ARIA Albums Chart top 50. His first live album, The Absolutely Very Best of Peter Combe (So Far) Recorded in Concert (1991), won his third trophy for Best Children's Album, in 1992.

Touring highlights were selling out the Sydney Opera House (twice) and the Melbourne Concert Hall, Carols in the Domain in Sydney, Carols nights in Brisbane, Adelaide and Hobart, filming Christmas Under the Stars at the Adelaide Festival Centre, Family Concerts with the Adelaide Symphony Orchestra at the Festival Theatre and Entertainment Centre – plus numerous television appearances and radio interviews. Combe's albums have received 7 gold and 3 platinum accreditations.

From 1989 to 1991, Peter presented another radio program, Ticklepot, on ABC Radio National. His co-presenter Henry Salter played the part of Monkey, and the 10-minute program followed the adventures of Peter and Monkey through songs and stories.  In all, 420 programs went to air over a period of 3 years.  Ticklepot was voted best children's radio program in the world in New York in 1991.

1993-present: Continued success

In 1993, Peter's musical version of May Gibbs' classic book "Snugglepot & Cuddlepie", was performed in the Adelaide Festival of Arts. This was originally performed as a cantata with orchestra, choirs and soloists. It was reproduced the following year in the Adelaide Festival Theatre with the Adelaide Symphony Orchestra – and this was recorded and is still available on CD. There have been many subsequent performances around Australia, some as a cantata and others with an accompanying script.

Further albums of new songs were to follow -Spook (1993), Little Groover (1996), Best Friends (1999), plus some picture books with CD by Scholastic – Wash Your Face in Orange Juice and Juicy Juicy Green Grass.

From 2003 to 2006, Combe read and sang a number of classic fairy tales. These were released on CD as Classic Fairy Tales Classic Fairy Tales Vol 2 and Classic Fairy Tales Vol 3.

In 2006, he crossed over to the genre of political commentary with his song "Free David Hicks".

Since 2005, Combe has started playing pub gigs around Australia aimed at young adults who grew up listening to his music. A clip of the live performance at the Corner Hotel in Melbourne is available showing a crowd of young adults singing along to lyrics such as "Wash Your Face in Orange Juice", and "Belly Flop on a Pizza? Ewww!".

Live It Up, was released on 6 April 2017. Combe toured the album across Australia

In 2018 Combe performed his 1990 Peter Combe's Christmas Album in full across the country in a national tour.

Personal life
Combe resides in Adelaide, South Australia and spends time at his holiday house in Carrickalinga.

Combe and his wife Carol have four children - a son and three daughters - who have all performed with him over the years: Joni, Alice, Emily and Thomas 'Thom'; and eight grandchildren, including Amelie, Hugo, Holly (Joni's children), Oliver and Eliza (Alice's children).

From 1995 to 2000, Joni was the presenter of Nine Network television series Here's Humphrey, then from 1998 to 2001, she played the role of Rainbow Rhapsody in all three home videos (The Fairies/Fairy Hello!, A Fairy Merry Christmas and Farmyard Magic) and four of the albums (The Fairies, A Fairy Merry Christmas, Farmyard Magic and A Magical Fairy Party) of The Fairies. Both of the shows were filmed in Adelaide.

Emily and Thomas performed together in the band "The Finishing School".

Growing up, Combe's father would wake him up at 6am to play tennis and he admits he's quite a good player.

Combe's favourite artists are Bob Dylan, Peter, Paul and Mary and The Springfields.

Discography

Studio albums

Live albums

Compilation albums

Box sets

Awards and nominations

APRA Music Awards
The APRA Awards are held in Australia and New Zealand by the Australasian Performing Right Association to recognise songwriting skills, sales and airplay performance by its members annually.

ARIA Music Awards
The ARIA Music Awards is an annual awards ceremony that recognises excellence, innovation, and achievement across all genres of Australian music.

References

1948 births
ARIA Award winners
Australian guitarists
Australian singer-songwriters
Australian children's musicians
Acoustic guitarists
Australian expatriates in the United Kingdom
Australian pianists
Australian television presenters
Australian schoolteachers
Living people
Musicians from Adelaide
Australian ukulele players
Male pianists
21st-century pianists
21st-century Australian male musicians
21st-century Australian musicians
Australian male guitarists
Australian male singer-songwriters
Australian multi-instrumentalists